The fifth season of the animated comedy series Bob's Burgers began airing on Fox in the United States on October 5, 2014, and concluded on May 17, 2015.

Production
On September 26, 2013, the series was renewed for a fifth production cycle. 

This season featured guest appearances from Kumail Nanjiani, Rachel Dratch, Zach Galifianakis, Bill Hader, Carl Reiner, Molly Shannon, Nick Offerman, Joe Lo Truglio, Jordan Peele, Carly Simon and Keegan-Michael Key.

Episodes

References

External links
 Official website
 
 

2014 American television seasons
2015 American television seasons
Bob's Burgers seasons